Phytoecia testaceovittata is a species of beetle in the family Cerambycidae. It was described by Maurice Pic in 1934. It is known from Iran.

References

Phytoecia
Beetles described in 1934